Chongori concentration camp (also spelled Jungeori, Jongori or Jeonger-ri) is a reeducation camp in North Korea. The official name of the camp is Kyo-hwa-so No. 12 (Reeducation camp no. 12).

Location
The camp is located near Chongori, a little village in Musan-ri, Hoeryong county, at the road and railroad almost halfway between Hoeryong and Chongjin, North Hamgyong province in North Korea.

Description
In 2005 the camp contained around 2000 prisoners, mostly non-political criminals, but they were often forced to serve their sentences there as punishment for desperate offences such as stealing food. They are guarded by around 300 prison guards, all of whom are armed with machine guns. From 2006 onward, the number of prisoners significantly increased, because many defectors who were deported from China were arrested and imprisoned in Chongori camp. Theoretically, prisoners should be released after they have completed reeducation through labour and served their full sentences, but because their prison sentences are very long and the camp's living conditions are very harsh, many prisoners do not survive their prison sentences. A former prisoner estimates, that during his eight months of detention, around 800 prisoners died because they were forced to do hard labour and they were only given sub-subsistence level food rations.

Purpose
The main purpose of Chongori camp is to punish people for usual crimes or political crimes such as illegal border crossings. The prisoners are also used as slave laborers, and as a result, they are forced to do hard and dangerous work for 14 hours a day. There is a copper ore mine, a logging section, a furniture factory and a farming section in the camp.

Human rights situation
The prisoners in Chongori concentration camp live in crowded, dirty, insect-infested rooms without heating, while there is just one washing room for 1000 prisoners. Because of these bad hygienic conditions, in the summer of 2003, around 190 prisoners died of an infectious disease according to Lee Jun Ha. 70 prisoners sleep in a room which is only designed to hold 20 people, lying on the floor without pillows or blankets.

Prisoners only get 140 grams of rice three times a day, while they are being forced to do hard labour such as logging with iron chains. Often, prisoners are killed  or they are crippled in work accidents, because they have to do dangerous work with primitive means. A former prisoner reported that accidental deaths occurred every few days in the furniture factory because its machines were antiquated and prisoners seldom slept more than five hours per night. Virtually every day after work and before they receive their dinner, prisoners are forced to engage in mutual criticism sessions and they receive less food as punishment for flaws or shortcomings. Because prisoners are so hungry, they even eat grass and corn which is mixed with cow feces. Lee Jun Ha estimates that around 30 to 40 people died as a result of malnutrition, work accidents or torture each month and their bodies were burnt on a nearby mountain.

Prisoners are regularly subjected to beatings, torture and inhuman treatment, all of which are arbitrarily administered at the guards' discretion. When a prisoner breaks a rule, he is tortured and confined in a solitary cell, only  in area, where he can not stretch his legs for many days or weeks. As an additional punishment, they are only given  of their usual food rations.  Several times a year, summary executions were carried out as punishment for failed escape attempts.

Kwon Hyo-jin has drawn a series of pictures which show the various forms of torture which he witnessed, such as the "pigeon torture", the "crane torture", the "aeroplane torture", and the "knee joint torture." Other human rights violations and forced labour in Chongori camp are featured in further drawings which he produced for an exhibition on political prison camps in North Korea.

The camp's staff has reportedly publicly executed inmates, without due process.

Prisoners (Witnesses)
 Lee Jun Ha (2000–2005 in Chongori) was imprisoned because he accidentally killed his uncle.
 Kwon Hyo-jin (~2001–2008 in Chongori) was imprisoned because he helped defectors to get to China. He is an artist in ceramics, painting and calligraphy and painted drawings of his experience in Chongori camp.

See also
 Human rights in North Korea
 Kaechon concentration camp
 Kwalliso
 Prisons in North Korea

External links
 Committee for Human Rights in North Korea: The Hidden Gulag - Overview of North Korean prison camps with testimonies and satellite photographs
 Database Center for North Korean Human Rights: Prisoners in North Korea Today - Comprehensive explanation of detention facilities in North Korea based on numerous defector testimonies
 Daily NK: Prison Tales – Prison memoir series by Lee Jun Ha
 One Free Korea: Camp 12 - Chongori camp with satellite photographs
  Korea Institute for National Unification - White paper on human rights in North Korea 2009 (page 179 and 443)
 Chosun Ilbo: N. Korea in brutal crackdown on defectors – Many defectors arrested and deported to Chongori camp
 Chongori concentration camp（全巨里教化所） - North Korean Refugees.com

References

Concentration camps in North Korea